On the Lam may refer to:

 On the lam
 On the Lam (album), a 2001 album by Cavity
 "On the Lam" (song), a 2010 song by Kele Okereke
 "On the Lam" (Adventure Time), an episode of Adventure Time